Undenheim is an Ortsgemeinde – a municipality belonging to a Verbandsgemeinde, a kind of collective municipality – in the Mainz-Bingen district in Rhineland-Palatinate, Germany. It belongs to the Verbandsgemeinde Rhein-Selz, whose seat is in Oppenheim.

Geography

Location
The municipality lies in Rhenish Hesse.

Neighbouring municipalities
These are Bechtolsheim, Gabsheim, Friesenheim, Köngernheim and Schornsheim.

Politics

Municipal council
BfU - Bürger für Undenheim
UFL - Undenheimer Freie Liste
WLU - Lebenswertes Undenheim e. V.
SPD - Social Democratic Party of Germany
CDU - Christian Democratic Union of Germany

Mayor
The current mayor is Marcus Becker of the citizens’ party Undenheimer freie Liste (UfL).

Town partnerships
 Blaisy-Bas, Côte-d'Or, France
 Dolcè, Province of Verona, Veneto, Italy

Culture and sightseeing
In 2003, Undenheim was chosen as “Rhenish Hesse’s loveliest village”.

Famous people

Sons and daughters of the town
Ludwig Schwamb (1890–1945) member of the Kreisau Circle

References

External links

Municipality’s official webpage 

Mainz-Bingen
Rhenish Hesse